The Bega Group is an Australian diversified food and drinks company with manufacturing sites in New South Wales, Queensland, Western Australia and Victoria. Founded as an agricultural cooperative in the town of Bega, New South Wales by their dairy suppliers, it became a public company in 2011 when it listed on the Australian Securities Exchange. Close to half of shares publicly traded are still held by Bega's farmer-suppliers. It is currently one of the largest companies in the dairy sector in Australia, with a base milk supply in 2018 of approximately 750 million litres per annum.

Over half of the Bega Group's revenue (as of 2019) comes from their spreads, dairy consumer packaged goods and other grocery products, with their flagship "Bega" brand holding 15.7% of the Australian retail cheese market. The Bega Group's other major consumer and foodservice packaged goods brands are "Vegemite", "Farmers Table", "Zoosh", "Picky Picky", "Tatura" and "Dairymont". The "Bega" branded Australia retail and foodservice cheese products are distributed by Fonterra under a long-term agreement. Just under a third of the Bega Group's revenue (as of 2019) was from exports. The cheese products  are exported to 40 countries and distributed across Australia where they are available in most supermarkets and general stores.

Their other major business segments include bulk core dairy ingredients such as cheese, cream cheese and powdered milk (making up approximately 35% of revenue) and nutritional products produced under the Bega Bionutrients brand (such as lactoferrin and milk protein concentrate), which make up around 9% of revenue.

In 2019, the company won a legal dispute with Kraft Heinz over the packaging of its peanut butter. In 2020, Kraft Heinz appealed the case to the Federal Court of Australia, but was dismissed. In 2021, the two companies had reached a confidential settlement.

In 2020, the company raised significant funds to purchase Kirin's suite of dairy products, including Dairy Farmers and Pura Milk. In 2022, the Bega Group was formed bringing together several brands including Bega Cheese, Vegemite, Dare Iced Coffee, Dairy Farmers, Farmers Union and Zooper Dooper.

Company milestones 

 1850s – dairying started in the Bega Valley.
 1899 – the Bega Co-operative Creamery Company was established by local farmers.
 1900 – Bega Cheese's original factory was opened.
 1960 – commissioned manufacturing facility for processing and packaging raw milk at Fyshwick, ACT
 1997 – cheese processing and packaging facility was built at Ridge Street, Bega
 1997 – joint venture established (now known as Capitol Chilled Foods) between Bega Cheese and Dairy Farmers (known as Australian Co-operative Foods) to process and distribute fresh milk and other chilled products in ACT and Southern NSW.
 April 2007 – acquired a 70% shareholding in Tatura Milk Industries Limited (Tatura Milk).
 October 2008 – purchased the assets and operations of De Cicco Industries in the Melbourne suburb of Coburg.
 March 2009 – acquired the cheese manufacturing facility of Kraft Foods at Strathmerton in Victoria.
 August 2011 – listed on the Australia Securities Exchange (ASX). Following the listing, Bega Cheese acquired the final 30% of Tatura Milk, which then became a wholly owned subsidiary of Bega Cheese.
 March 2014 – commissioned a life stage nutritional canning and blending plant in Derrimut, Victoria.
 January 2017 – acquired the Australian meals business from multinational food conglomerate Mondelez International with brands such as Vegemite, ZoOSh and Bonox, a licence for the Dairylea and Snackabouts brands, and the licence to manufacture Kraft-branded cheese and peanut butter through 2017, as well as a manufacturing site in Port Melbourne, Victoria. 
 February 2017 – sale of infant formula canning plant in Derrimut, Victoria and one spray milk powder dryer in Tatura, Victoria to US pediatric nutrition company Mead Johnson.
 December 2017 – acquisition of Peanut Company of Australia in Kingaroy, Queensland.
 July 2018 – purchase of Koroit milk drying and butter processing facility in Western Victoria from Saputo. 
 February 2019 – closure of the Coburg cheese manufacturing facility.
 2020 – Purple Hive Project by B honey
 November 2020 – purchased Lion Dairy & Drinks from Japan's Kirin Company for $534 million.

See also
 List of cheesemakers
 List of companies of Australia
 List of oldest companies in Australia

References

External links

Australian cheeses
Brand name dairy products
Dairy products companies of Australia
Food and drink companies established in 1899
Australian companies established in 1899
Companies listed on the Australian Securities Exchange
Australian brands
Fonterra brands
Peanut butter brands
Companies based in New South Wales
Bega Valley Shire